The anianiau (pronounced ) (Magumma parva) is a species of Hawaiian honeycreeper that is endemic to upper elevation forests on the island of Kauai.

This species seems to be rather distantly related to the typical Hemignathini (such as the amakihis and nukupuus). It is placed in the monotypic genus Magumma.

Description
The anianiau has a slightly curved bill and a mass of about 10 g. The plumage of the female is more uniform and has a duller yellow-green color than the male's bright yellow. Its call is a pair of notes, tew-weet, while its song is a trill of wee-see, wee-see, wee-see.

Habitat
Anianiau are found in mesic and wet forests at elevations above .  The highest densities occur above . Dominant tree species in its habitat include koa (Acacia koa), ōhia lehua (Metrosideros polymorpha), ōlapa (Cheirodendron trigynum), and lapalapa (C. platyphyllum).

Diet
The anianiau mainly feeds on nectar from the flowers of plants such as ōhia lehua (Metrosideros polymorpha), ōhelo (Vaccinium spp.), and alani (Melicope spp.).  It will also take arthropods from trees, shrubs, or vines.

Breeding
The anianiau breeding season ranges from February to June. The female makes a small cup-shaped nest of twigs and lichens in an ōhia tree. Typically, three eggs are laid. The small yellow chicks leave the nest in three weeks, but while in the nest they are fed on a mainly protein diet of caterpillars.

Discovery
The anianiau was first discovered in the 1830s, but was not seen again for another fifty years.  This species was not well studied until the 1960s.

Conservation
The range of the anianiau has contracted by 85%, as it previously could be found in all forests of Kauai.  Habitat degradation and invasion by non-native plants are the most significant threats to this species. Mosquito-transmitted diseases, such as avian malaria and fowlpox, are very rarely observed in captured anianiau, so they may not be a major cause of mortality. Predation by rats and cats is possible but has not been documented.  This species is protected in the Alakai Wilderness Preserve and surrounding environs as well as Waimea Canyon and Kokee State Parks.

References

External links
 Species factsheet - BirdLife International
 Videos, photos and sounds - Internet Bird Collection
 Kauai Forest Bird Recovery Project

Hawaiian honeycreepers
Carduelinae
Biota of Kauai
Endemic fauna of Hawaii
Birds described in 1887
Taxonomy articles created by Polbot